The 1974 PGA Championship was the 56th PGA Championship, played August 8–11 at Tanglewood Park in Clemmons, North Carolina, a suburb southwest of Winston-Salem. Lee Trevino won the first of his two PGA Championships, one stroke ahead of defending champion Jack Nicklaus. It was the fifth of Trevino's six major titles and Nicklaus was the runner-up to Trevino in a major for the fourth and final time. It was the first year since 1969 in which Nicklaus did not win a major championship, but he regained the title the following year.

Three-time champion Sam Snead, age 62, finished tied for third for his third consecutive top ten finish in the event. It was the final  major in which he was in contention, his next best finish was a tie for 42nd at the PGA Championship in 1979. Gary Player's bid to win three majors in 1974 came up short in the final round; the winner of the Masters and Open Championship finished four strokes back at even par, in seventh place.

Trevino used a putter he found in a friend's attic only days before and had only one three-putt, on the 71st hole. Tanglewood is a county-owned facility in Forsyth County.

This championship coincided with the resignation of President Nixon, who left office on Friday.

Past champions in the field

Made the cut

Missed the cut

Source:

Round summaries

First round
Thursday, August 8, 1974

Source:

Second round
Friday, August 9, 1974

Source:

Third round
Saturday, August 10, 1974

Lee Trevino shot 68 to take the lead at 207 (–3), while 36-hole leader John Schlee carded 75 to fall three strokes back.

Source:

Final round
Sunday, August 11, 1974

Source:

References

External links
PGA Media Guide 2012
GolfCompendium.com – 1974 PGA Championship
PGA.com – 1974 PGA Championship

PGA Championship
Golf in North Carolina
PGA Championship
PGA Championship
PGA Championship
PGA Championship